The 1886–87 Irish Cup was the seventh edition of the premier knock-out cup competition in Irish football.

Ulster won the tournament for the first time, defeating Cliftonville 3–1 in the final. The holders Distillery were eliminated in the fourth round by Glentoran.

Results

First round

|}

Replays

|}

Second round

|}

1 Although Moyola Park scratched to Kilrea, a protest from Magherafelt from the previous round led to the Irish Football Association to order Kilrea to re-play their first round match with Magherafelt. Kilrea refused and resigned from the Association.

Replay

|}

Second Replay

|}

Third round

|}

Fourth round

|}

Replay

|}

Semi-finals

|}

Final

References

External links
 Northern Ireland Cup Finals. Rec.Sport.Soccer Statistics Foundation (RSSSF)

Irish Cup seasons
1886–87 domestic association football cups
1886–87 in Irish association football